Susanna Andersson (born 7 December 1977) is a Swedish soprano and the winner of the 2003 Guildhall School of Music and Drama's Gold Medal Competition. Her debut performance was in 2005 and she played Zerlina in the Grange Park Opera’s staging of Don Giovanni.

Background 

Andersson was born in Östersund, Sweden. She received her education at the Ljungskile College Institute before moving to London where she was admitted to the Guildhall School of Music and Drama. In 2003 Susanna graduated from their opera course with First Class Honours.

In 2004 Susanna was chosen as the soloist for the Nobel Prize Award Ceremony at the Stockholm Concert Hall, where she performed with the Royal Stockholm Philharmonic Orchestra. Among the pieces she performed was “Proserpine” by Joseph Martin Kraus.

In 2006 and 2007 Andersson was the only singer chosen for the ECHO Rising Stars series at the Barbican Theatre, and she gave recitals with her pianist Eugene Asti in London, New York, Athens, Amsterdam, Birmingham (UK), Brussels, Stockholm, Cologne and Vienna.

Awards and prizes 

 2000 – Finalist, The Young Kathleen Ferrier Award
 2001 - Semi-finalist, The International Mozart Competition
 2004 – Sigrid Paskells Scholarship for the Performing Arts
 12 May 2003 - Andersson won the Guildhall School of Music and Drama’s Gold Medal Competition after the final performance at the Barbican Theatre, London. After performing pieces such as Debussy’s Pantomime and Clair de lune to piano and the Guildhall Symphony Orchestra, she was announced as the winner.
2004 – Song Prize at The Kathleen Ferrier Awards

Stage roles 

Opera

 Atalanta, Xerxes (GSMD)
 The Queen of the Night, The Magic Flute (Oxford Philharmonia, 2006)
 Lucia, Rape of Lucretia (Nurnberg KammerMusikFestival, 2003)
 Flora, Turn of the Screw (Nurnberg KammerMusicFestival, 2004)
 Philline, Mignon (GSMD, 2005)
 Therese, Les Mamelles de Tiresias (GSMD)
 Susanna, The Marriage of Figaro (Guildhall 2004)
 Adina, L'Elisir d'amore (Staatstheater, Nurnberg, 2006)
 Giannetta, The Elixir of Love (2007, Opera North)
 Echo, Echo and Narcissus, The Lindbury Theatre at Covent Garden (2007)
 Papagena, The Magic Flute (2007, English National Opera)
 Die Freudin, Von heute auf morgen (2008, Oper Leipzig)
 Blondchen, Die Entführung aus dem Serail (2008, Oper Leipzig)
 Servilia, La clemenza di Tito (2008, Oper Leipzig)
 Valencienne, The Merry Widow (2008, Oper Leipzig)
 Papagena, The Magic Flute (2008, Oper Leipzig)
 Zerbinetta, Ariadne auf Naxos (2008, Oper Leipzig)
 Venus/Gepopo, Le Grand Macabre (2009, English National Opera)
 Oscar (2013, Un Ballo in Maschera, Teatro Colón of Buenos Aires)

External links 
 
 IMG Artists profile
 Press release: Guildhall School of Music & Drama Gold Medal winner 2003 + biographical info
 The Nobel Foundation press info: The Nobel Prize Award Ceremony and Banquet in Stockholm 2004
 The Kathleen Ferrier Awards winners
 Operabase list of future commitments at Oper Leipzig
 Sigrid Paskells Scholarship for the Performing Arts
 The Times review of The Magic Flute at the English National Opera, 2 October 2007

1977 births
Living people
People from Östersund
Swedish operatic sopranos
Swedish expatriates in England
Alumni of the Guildhall School of Music and Drama
21st-century Swedish women opera singers